The dhoti, also known as veshti, mardani, chaadra, dhontar, jaiñboh & panchey, is a type of sarong, fastened in between the legs in a manner that it outwardly resembles trousers, sometimes loose but other tighter fittings are worn as well. It is a lower garment forming part of the ethnic costume for men in the Indian subcontinent. The dhoti is touted as the male counterpart of the saari worn by females to religious and secular ceremonies (functions).  is a yellow silk dhoti worn on auspicious occasions. The dhoti worn over the lower waist and drawn up in between the legs, is a 5-yard-long piece of woven fabric; it must not be confused with prestitched "dhoti pants", which are a new ready to wear trend these days, popular among women and typical of children.

Etymology

The word dhoti is derived from dhauti (Sanskrit: धौती), translated "to cleanse" or "to wash". In the context of clothing, it simply refers to the cleansed garment which was worn as part of everyday attire The dhoti evolved from the ancient antriya which was passed through the legs, tucked at the back and covered the legs loosely, then flowed into long pleats at front of the legs, the same way it is worn today as formal dhoti. While a casual and short dhoti wraps around both legs firmly, in this style the back side of the dhoti is pulled to the front and tucked at the waist, before tucking the two loose ends at back, creating firmly fitted trouser-like dhoti that wraps around both legs. This style is more commonly worn by farmers and martial artists.

Names and styles 

The garment is known by various names, such as:

Custom and usage 

The pancha is worn by many conservative Jain men when they visit Derasars or Basadis for puja; unstitched clothing is believed by some Jains to be "less permeable to pollution" and therefore more appropriate for religious rituals than other garments. They also wear a loose and unstitched cloth, shorter than the pancha on top.

Hare Krishna, known for its distinctive dress code, prompts Western adherents to wear pancha, usually of saffron or white cloth folded in a traditional style. Maharishi Mahesh Yogi was known for wearing a white silk dhoti.

The dhoti has been ethnically worn by farmers, pehlwano (wrestlers) and shepherds (grazers) of the Sikhs in the Punjab region; it was discouraged during the Punjab Subah Movement, owing it to the inter-communal tensions prevalent at the time. The dhothi was also worn by South Canarese Christian men to their pre-nup ceremonies, Church weddings & receptions until the 1960s, when they fell out of favour; since then grooms have been styling the black suit and tie instead.

There's a distinction between the lungi, a similar garment often worn by people at their homes, as it is more casual and comfortable, dhoti is sometimes even worn by secular politicians.

At the height of the Indian Independence Movement, weaving was a symbol of the Swadeshi Movement. In 1921, the famed M K Gandhi himself championed only the dhoti often topless and without a kurta, to promote and identify with the weaves and handicrafts, produced by the rural and the poor of his homeland.

See also 

Dhoti Lota Aur Chowpatty
 Khadi
 Khādī Development and Village Industries Commission
 Kilt
 Lederhosen
 Longyi
 Mundu
 Malong
 Sompot
 Sompot Chong Kben
 Sarong
 Shendyt
 Toga
 Harem pants

References 

Hindu religious clothing
Indian clothing
Pakistani clothing
Folk costumes